Baker-Brook (2016 population: 564) is a former village in Madawaska County, New Brunswick, Canada.

Geography
It is located on the Saint John River 20 kilometres west of Edmundston.

History

The village takes its name from 19th-century sawmill businessman John Baker.

In 1818, Baker, a native of Maine, settled in the area, along with several other American families. He was dissatisfied with the official borders, and in 1827 declared the village to be capital of the "Republic of Madawaska", a self-proclaimed unrecognized sovereign state being part neither of the United States nor of British America (Canada) although comprising portions of both. Baker was subsequently briefly jailed by the British for treason. A US citizen by birth, John Baker continued to live on his settlement as a somewhat reluctant British subject after Baker Brook was officially declared part of New Brunswick.

Demographics

Population trend

Mother tongue (2016)

Attractions
The local Roman Catholic church, houses noted religious artwork, including stained-glass windows from the workshop of Belgian artist José Gaterrath and the Stations of the Cross by the famous Spanish ceramist Jordi Bonet.

Notable people

See also
List of communities in New Brunswick

References

External links

Communities in Madawaska County, New Brunswick
Former villages in New Brunswick